Complete History Volume Two is a compilation album by the Washington, D.C. hardcore punk band Government Issue, compiling the band's recordings from 1987 to 1989. It was released January 22, 2002 through Dr. Strange Records as a sequel to 2000's Complete History Volume One. Together, the two Complete History albums collect nearly all of the band's recorded output. While Volume One included contributions from a number of musicians—as singer John Stabb and drummer Marc Alberstad were the band's only constant members from 1980 to 1986—Volume Two is entirely composed of recordings by the band's final lineup of Stabb, guitarist Tom Lyle, bass guitarist J. Robbins, and drummer Peter Moffett.

Reception 
Jack Rabid of Allmusic gave Complete History Volume Two three stars out of five, calling it "a rare case where a Volume Two is the far superior" and attributing the addition of Robbins and Moffett with completing Government Issue's evolution from "an inferior hardcore-thrash band" to something more original. He cited You as the turning point, calling it "a quantum leap in hefty, precise, pure power" and stating that "[Robbins and Moffett's] added harmonies (especially), superb playing, chops, and dexterity fit perfect with Stabb and guitarist Tom Lyle's clear plan to cut all ties with lame hardcore cretins — while maintaining the big-guitar edge and bomb-running melodies of their punk roots." He noted elements of psychedelic rock in the music and hints of The Damned in Stabb's singing, and remarked that the addition of Crash and the second disc of live recordings "makes [Volume Two] an even more rock-solid pick-up."

Track listing 
All songs written and composed by Government Issue.
Disc one

Disc two

Personnel

Band 
 John Stabb – lead vocals
 Tom Lyle – guitar, producer (tracks 1–11 and 13–22 on disc 1)
 J. Robbins – bass guitar, lead vocals on "Crash"
 Peter Moffett – drums, mix engineer (tracks 13–22 on disc 1)

Production 
 Jim Fox – recording engineer (tracks 1–11 and 13–22 on disc 1)
 Chris Biondo – additional recording (tracks 1–11 on disc 1)
 Eric L. – mix engineer (tracks 13–22 on disc 1)
 Rob Bowers – recording engineer (tracks 1–13 on disc 2), mix engineer (tracks 28 and 29 on disc 2)
 Jerry Williams – mix engineer (tracks 14–27 on disc 2)
 Doug Johnston – recording engineer for this compilation
 Jeff Caudill – art direction and design

References 

2002 compilation albums
Government Issue albums
Dr. Strange Records albums